The Music Upstairs is a 1962 Australian television play. It was written by Australian playwright Michael Noonan when he was living in England. It starred Felicity Young who was married to George Thoms.

Plot
Three doctors, Joe, Ruth and Tom, have just graduated are driving through London when they run over a pedestrian. The doctors panic and decide not to stop. Joe wants to confess, but Tom is indifferent and Ruth loves Tom. The pedestrian later dies and a person who witnessed the accident starts to blackmail them.

Cast
 Felicity Young as Ruth
 Edward Brayshaw as Tom
 Jeffrey Hodgson as Joe

Production
William Sterling said "the play s hard hitting with lots of emphasis on suspense... jazzy beat music provides background."

Reception
The Bulletin TV critic, Frank Roberts, referred to a recent request in parliament by Bill Hayden to ensure legislative protection for Australian actors and writers. I stood   it   for 30   minutes,   creating  some   kind   of  endurance   record, and  then   switched to The   Untouchables." This review prompted a letter of criticism from Ted Willis.

References

External links
 
 The Music Upstairs at AustLit
Complete script at National Archives of Australia

1962 films
Australian television films
Australian television plays
Films directed by William Sterling (director)